Kevin Eldon (born 2 October 1959) is an English actor and comedian. He featured in British comedy television shows of the 1990s including Fist of Fun, This Morning with Richard Not Judy, Knowing Me, Knowing You with Alan Partridge, Big Train, Brass Eye and Jam. In 2013, Eldon appeared in his own BBC sketch series It's Kevin. He has also appeared in minor speaking roles in the HBO series Game of Thrones.

Personal life
Eldon was born in Chatham, Kent. He has been a practising Buddhist since 1990. He has two children with his wife Holly, whom he met in late 2005 on the set of Hyperdrive, where she was the art director.

Early career and Lee & Herring
Eldon occupies half a page in Oliver Gray's book called Volume – A Cautionary Tale of Rock and Roll Obsession; this includes coverage of punk-era Hampshire where, in late 1978, with two schoolmates from Bay House School, Gosport, Eldon started a band named Virginia Doesn't. Virginia Doesn't's career peaked with a session broadcast on Radio One's John Peel Show on 18 October 1979. In early 1980, Virginia Doesn't morphed into The Time, in which Eldon was again the front man. The Time recorded and performed from April 1980 until August 1982, during which time the band gigged extensively and played support slots with The Jam, Joe Jackson's Jumpin' Jive and Bad Manners. The Time had songs included on several self-released tape compilations, although they never secured a recording contract. In August 1982, The Time became Gerry Hackett & The Fringes, a spoof Sixties revival band. On 6 November 1983 Gerry Hackett & The Fringes appeared on BBC South's 'The Cellar Show' presented by John Sessions. Eldon started on the stand-up circuit in the early 1990s performing an act in-character as the political poet Paul Hamilton, but has also, on occasion, done stand-up as himself.

On the circuit, Eldon formed a friendship with stand-up comedian Stewart Lee, which would later lead to an invitation to work with him on the radio series Lee & Herring's Fist of Fun with Lee's comedy partner Richard Herring. Lee and Herring would usually refer to him as "the actor Kevin Eldon", in reference to his claim to being an actor rather than a comedian. Eldon's work sat well with that of Lee and Herring, and he continued to work with them on many of their projects, including The Lee & Herring Radio Show, Fist of Fun and This Morning with Richard Not Judy. He played recurring characters Simon Quinlank (the self-styled "King of Hobbies") and 'Rod Hull', a nonsensical version of Rod Hull with a prosthetic limb and an obsession with jelly, especially the 'green' variety. In 1994 and 1997, he appeared at the Edinburgh Fringe Festival as part the comedy troupe Cluub Zarathustra; other comedians in the troupe including Roger Mann, Johnny Vegas, Simon Munnery, and later Stewart Lee. They were given a Channel 4 pilot, which led to the television series Attention Scum! The book You Are Nothing by Robert Wringham praises the performers' talent. From March 2009, Eldon appeared in Stewart Lee's Comedy Vehicle in a number of the show's sketches most often with Paul Putner.

Stage and screen

Eldon has appeared in many British comedy shows from the 1990s onwards. One of his first appearances on television was in 1995 in Knowing Me, Knowing You with Alan Partridge as Fanny Thomas, a foul-mouthed transvestite chef and then later appeared on I'm Alan Partridge as the laughing racist, Mike Samson.

During the 1990s he worked with such comedians as Simon Pegg, Mark Heap, Julia Davis, Amelia Bullmore and others in the sketch-comedy series Big Train. One of Eldon's more notable characters for Big Train, George Martin, was inspired by his impression of the Beatles producer. He had previously worked with some of the cast in the satirical series Brass Eye, and the dark comedy Jam, both written by Christopher Morris. Eldon would later act in Nathan Barley and the 2010 film Four Lions as a police sniper (also written by Christopher Morris). In 2004, Eldon appeared in the BAFTA award-winning dark comedy Nighty Night as Terry Tyrrell, husband to Julia Davis' character. They also appeared later in Hunderby (another dark comedy written by Julia Davis), Little Crackers and Psychobitches. He worked again with Pegg in an episode in the sitcom Spaced with Mark Gatiss, both of whom played two Matrix-style government agents, and in the comedy film Hot Fuzz where he played Sergeant Tony Fisher.

Eldon has appeared on stage and screen numerous times with the comedian Bill Bailey; they performed as a spoof of the German band Kraftwerk, singing German versions of the "Hokey Cokey" and The Wurzels song "The Combine Harvester" for the recorded version of Bill Bailey's Part Troll comedy tour, along with two others (John Moloney and Martin Trenaman). He played the same role in Bailey's 2007 Tinselworm tour, Channel 4's Comedy Gala in 2010, and Bailey's 2010 Dandelion Mind tour. In late 2006, Eldon, alongside Bill Bailey, helped to organise and produce a short tour and a West End run of Pinter's People at the Haymarket Theatre, London. The show was a collection of sketches written by Harold Pinter, also starring Geraldine McNulty and Sally Phillips. They appeared together again when Eldon was a panellist on Never Mind the Buzzcocks in 2007 (with Bailey as team captain), as well as on the 'Dave' show Alan Davies: As Yet Untitled. They also acted together in the sitcom Black Books 'Grapes of Wrath' episode, where Eldon played "The Cleaner". Eldon has also had minor guest starring roles in numerous comedy projects, including Smack the Pony, Green Wing, The IT Crowd and The Kennedys.

In February 2010, Eldon appeared in the pilot for a "sort-of-sketch-show" called Missing Scene. In 2011 he appeared in sketches throughout How TV Ruined Your Life, and with Paul Whitehouse, as one of a pair of women 1950s typists in season four of Harry and Paul. In October 2013, Eldon read his own short story "What do you say?" on the storytelling series Crackanory, an adult-oriented remake of the children's television series Jackanory.

In 2013, Eldon was given a six-part sketch comedy series called It's Kevin, broadcast on BBC Two. The show had many guest stars, mostly comedians that Eldon had already worked with before. Every episode ended with a song, including: "Mobile Phone", sung by the mock Swiss pop duo Popsox played by Eldon and Bill Bailey; "Brad", where the bully character Brad was played by Peter Serafinowicz; and "Pension Rap". Regular characters included the obnoxious poet Paul Hamilton; Stanley Duthorpe, the fictional man from the North of England; and an offensive French musician. These characters also appeared in Eldon's stand-up DVD Kevin Eldon is Titting About. Eldon also wrote a spoof biography on Paul Hamilton called "My Prefect Cousin: A Short Biography of Paul Hamilton" in 2013 where he pretends that Hamilton is his own cousin. Big Train writer Arthur Matthews was one of the guest writers for the show.

In October 2008, he played the part of pessimistic, unpopular Big Brother housemate Joplin in Charlie Brooker's five-part E4 horror thriller, Dead Set. He has also appeared in several minor serious roles in British drama shows such as Robin Hood, Utopia, Merlin, Skins, New Tricks and Hustle. In 2016, he appears in the 6th season of the American fantasy drama series, Game of Thrones along with Richard E. Grant as part of a theatre troupe, with Eldon's character portraying a version of Ned Stark. Uncredited appearances include the 2005 film version of Charlie and the Chocolate Factory, playing "Man with Dog" alongside Mark Heap and the 2014 film Cuban Fury, as the neighbour to the main character played by Nick Frost. He has also played an English policeman in Martin Scorsese's 2011 film Hugo. Eldon played the role of Pete in the David Shrigley/Chris Shepherd animation, Who I Am And What I Want, and also of Mick McManus in Tim Plester's short film World of Wrestling in 2007. In 2009, he played the lead role of Arthur in Radio Mania: An Abandoned Work, a stereoscopic 3D film for the BFI, directed by British artists Iain Forsyth and Jane Pollard.,

Eldon co-authored the theme tune, and is script editor for, the children's series Genie in the House. He provided the voice of Penfold in the 2015 revival series of Danger Mouse. He also appeared in the 2015 series of the children's comedy sketch show Horrible Histories as William the Conqueror - performing a parody version of Korean popstar PSY's hit, Gangnam Style called "Norman Style". He has also been a contestant on the gameshow Pointless Celebrities and was winner in a 2014 episode of Celebrity Mastermind, where his specialist subject was "The Music of The Beatles".

Eldon voiced the character of Frobisher in the 2012 PlayStation Vita game Frobisher Says, and provided voice work for the 2013 indie game Gun Monkeys by Size Five Games.

In 2019 he played Lance Corporal Jones in Dad's Army: The Lost Episodes, a recreation of three missing episodes of the BBC comedy Dad's Army.

Radio
From 1997 to 1999, Eldon appeared in BBC Radio 1 show, Blue Jam, which was later adapted into the TV series Jam.

In 2001, Eldon appeared in the non-canon Doctor Who four-part webcast series "Death Comes to Time", in which he played Antimony, a companion to the Seventh Doctor.

In 2008, Eldon presented Poets' Tree, a four-part "poetry type programme" for BBC Radio 4, in the character of Paul Hamilton, which was co-written and edited by Stewart Lee. Eldon has also written and starred in a six-part series of monologues as people from different professions, collectively entitled Speakers, broadcast on the London art radio station Resonance FM. He has also appeared in a CERN podcast with Simon Munnery. In 2012 and 2014, he produced his own radio series called Kevin Eldon Will See You Now which aired on Radio 4.

Between 2009 and 2013, Eldon appeared as both Dean the Dwarf and Kreech, the "Right Hand of Darkness" in the BBC Radio 4 parody of the Lord of the Rings Trilogy called ElvenQuest. He has made guest appearances on Radio 4's Fags, Mags and Bags, North by Northamptonshire and The Horne Section. He was also part of 7th series of the tag team interview radio series Chain Reaction. He was interviewed by John Cooper Clarke and he then interviewed Mark Steel.

Between 2016 and 2021, Eldon appeared in four series of Kevin Eldon Will See You Now, a comedy sketch show on BBC Radio 4. He also appeared in Quanderhorn, a science fiction comedy radio series written by Andrew Marshall and Rob Grant. The first series was originally broadcast in the United Kingdom by BBC Radio 4 in 2018, and a second in 2020.

Filmography

Film

Television

Video games

Releases 
 Kevin Eldon is Titting About (2010) DVD
 Mr Bartlett and Mr Willis (2010) CD

References

External links

 
 
 CERN Podcast: Kevin Eldon and Simon Munnery visit CERN
 Poet's Tree – Downloads of Kevin's 2008 Radio Series
 Downloads of Kevin's Resonance FM Monologues
 https://web.archive.org/web/20160201131322/http://www.specializedproject.co.uk/latestnews/rock-supergroup-the-spammed-recording-tommy-gun/

Living people
English male comedians
English male film actors
English male television actors
Male actors from Kent
People from Chatham, Kent
21st-century English male actors
20th-century English male actors
1959 births
English male voice actors